"Cajun Moon" is a song written by Jim Rushing, and recorded by American country music artist Ricky Skaggs.  It was released in January 1986 as the second single from the album Live in London.  The song was Skaggs' tenth #1 on the country chart.  The single went to #1 for one week and spent 13 weeks on the country chart.

Chart performance

References

1986 singles
Ricky Skaggs songs
Epic Records singles
Songs written by Jim Rushing
Song recordings produced by Ricky Skaggs
1986 songs